Left for Dead is the sixth studio album by American thrash metal band Lȧȧz Rockit. It was released on July 25, 2008 on Massacre Records and follows 1991's Nothing's Sacred. It is the band's only album since 1989 to feature the original line-up, apart from new drummer Sky Harris, and their final album with bassist Willy Lange before his death 10 years later. It's also the first studio album in 17 years and the most recent to date.

Track listing

Credits
Michael Coons – lead vocals
Aaron Jellum – guitars
Phil Kettner – guitars
Willy Lange – bass
Sky Harris – drums

Production
Juan Urteaga – producer, mixing, mastering
Ace Cook – executive producer
Scott Lee Sargeant – producer
Mark DeVito – design, layout
Aaron Jellum – co-producer

External links
BNR Metal band page

2008 albums
Lȧȧz Rockit albums
Massacre Records albums